

The President's Inauguration Medal (Sinhala: ජනාධිපති ධූරප්‍රාප්ත පදක්කම janādhipathi dhūraprāptha padakkama) was a decoration of the Military of Sri Lanka, granted to all regular servicepersons of the country's armed services in service on 4 February 1978, following a formal recommendation by the tri-service commanders. The decoration commemorated the inauguration of the first executive president of Sri Lanka, J. R. Jayewardene.

References

Army, Sri Lanka. (1st Edition – October 1999). "50 YEARS ON" – 1949–1999, Sri Lanka Army.

External links
Sri Lanka Army
Sri Lanka Navy
Sri Lanka Air Force
Sri Lanka Police
Ministry of Defence : Sri Lanka

Military awards and decorations of Sri Lanka
Awards established in 1978
1978 establishments in Sri Lanka